BlackBerry World was an application distribution service (app marketplace) by BlackBerry Limited. The service provided BlackBerry users with an environment to browse, download, and update mobile apps, including third-party applications.

It worked with BlackBerry 10 devices, the BlackBerry PlayBook, and a majority of BlackBerry OS devices. At one point in 2011, BlackBerry World had the largest revenue per app at $9,166.67, compared to its rivals ($6,562.50 by Nokia Ovi Store, $6,480.00 by Apple App Store and $1,200.00 by Google Android Market), although total revenue was lower than Apple App Store.  

BlackBerry devices after 2015 (with the release of BlackBerry Priv) no longer use the BlackBerry 10 operating system, but Android operating system instead, which utilise the Google Play store instead. BlackBerry World servers alongside other BlackBerry services shut down in January 2022.

History

In 2003, Research In Motion (RIM) (now known as BlackBerry Limited) launched the Mobile Data Service to enable customers to access Java-based third-party enterprise applications using the secure real-time push-based BlackBerry infrastructure.

Later on 21 October 2008, RIM announced at the BlackBerry Developer Conference that the company would open an application store for their devices.  
It was also announced that the store was scheduled to be open in March 2009, and would work in conjunction with PayPal's services.  On 19 January 2009, RIM began accepting submissions of applications from developers.

On 4 March 2009, RIM officially named the store 'BlackBerry App World' (previously called the BlackBerry Application Storefront).  It was also confirmed that the service would not initially be available for desktops, and only a web-based catalogue would be accessible from non-BlackBerry devices.

On 1 April 2009, at the Cellular Telecommunications and Internet Association (CTIA) trade show, RIM announced that App World had gone live.

At the BlackBerry-sponsored Wireless Symposium, it was announced that an average of one million apps were being downloaded each day.

On 19 August 2010, BlackBerry App World 2.0 was released.  This new version introduced BlackBerry ID; a single sign, account system that can be used on both the BlackBerry client, and the BlackBerry App World desktop storefront.  In addition to BlackBerry ID, BlackBerry App World 2.0 also introduced direct credit card billing and carrier billing for AT&T Wireless subscribers.

On 3 December 2010, Research in Motion announced that daily downloads were two million apps per day.

On 2 February 2011, BlackBerry App World 2.1 was released.  This version introduced in-app purchases of digital goods, allowing for add-ons to be purchased within applications.

On 21 January 2013, BlackBerry announced that it rebranded the BlackBerry App World to simpler BlackBerry World, as part of the release of the BlackBerry 10 operating system.

On 18 June 2014, BlackBerry announced an official relationship with Amazon, which includes access to Amazon Appstore in BlackBerry 10.3.

On 14 December 2017, BlackBerry announced that BlackBerry World would close at the end of 2019, however the store was not closed, and continued to function as of August 2020.  On 1 April 2018, BlackBerry removed payment features from BlackBerry World.

The store eventually closed in January 2022 with other BlackBerry 10 and BlackBerry OS services.

Milestones
At the beginning of 2011, 16,000 apps were available on BlackBerry App World.  A year later, the app store passed 60,000 apps (January 2012), and a month later 70,000 apps (February 2012).  At BlackBerry Jam in September 2012, RIM announced that App World had more than 105,000 apps.

In May 2013, at the Blackberry Live Conference, BlackBerry announced that over 120,000 apps for BlackBerry 10 were available to download from BlackBerry World.

Application verification was done for BlackBerry World apps about content and quality before is agreed to launch.  About 85 percent of the verification was done in Denpasar, Bali, Indonesia.

Pricing and availability
Research In Motion (RIM) announced that the store would initially be available in the United Kingdom, Canada, and the United States. As of March 2013, BlackBerry World was available in 170 markets, and supporteds 23 currencies and 33 languages. Over 6 million applications were downloaded daily, with an aggregate of over 4 billion downloads to-date.

As of August 2020, BlackBerry World was available in 171 countries and territories.

Applications were both free and paid; from $0.99, to $599.99 USD in the U.S.

The store was available for the following BlackBerry devices that are updated to BlackBerry OS version 4.5.0 or higher:

BlackBerry Leap
BlackBerry Porsche Design P'9983
BlackBerry Classic
BlackBerry Passport
BlackBerry Porsche Design P'9982
BlackBerry Q5
BlackBerry Q10
BlackBerry Z3
BlackBerry Z10
BlackBerry Z30
BlackBerry Bold 9900/9000/9700/9780/9650/9790
BlackBerry 9720
BlackBerry PlayBook
BlackBerry Porsche Design P'9981 9981
BlackBerry Torch 9800/9810 - Preloaded
BlackBerry Style 9670 - Preloaded
BlackBerry Storm and BlackBerry Storm2 9500/9520/9530/9550
BlackBerry Tour 9630
BlackBerry Pearl 3G 9100/9105
BlackBerry Pearl 8100/8110/8120/8130
BlackBerry Pearl Flip 8220/8230
BlackBerry Curve 3G 9300/9330
BlackBerry Curve 8900
BlackBerry Curve 8520/8530/9320
BlackBerry Curve 8300 8300/8310/8320/8330
BlackBerry 8800
BlackBerry PlayBook

Storage
Users were initially allowed to archive their apps on a MicroSD, or on eMMC storage of certain BlackBerry smartphone models.  The archive to external memory card function was later removed with the release of App World 3.0.

Developer
In 2010, Research In Motion (RIM) announced several new tools to make it easier for BlackBerry applications developers to build, simulate, deploy, and monetise feature-rich applications on the BlackBerry platform; including the BlackBerry Enterprise Application Development Platform, the next generation BlackBerry Web Application Platform, BlackBerry WebWorks Platform for the BlackBerry PlayBook™ Tablet and BlackBerry smartphones, and BlackBerry Payment Service, BlackBerry Push Service, BlackBerry Advertising Service, Location Service, Maps Services, Analytics Service, Scoreloop, BBM Social Platform Software Developer Kits, et al.

BlackBerry embraced open standards, and included a variety of open source libraries out of the box including: Lua, OpenAL, cocos2d-x, and Box2D, and has an open source repository that can be accessed at GitHub.com/blackberry.  This open ecosystem helps developers target multiple platforms through partnerships with Appcelerator, Apache Cordova, dojo, jQuery Mobile, Marmalade, NME, Qt, and Sencha Touch.

BlackBerry has changed its whole direction of development tools, mainly embracing their C++ / Cascades as the 'native' road to develop mobile apps for their BlackBerry 10 platform.  HTML5 is considered the almost-native second path for development.  In April 2014, BlackBerry has announced to stop the support of Adobe Air with the release of BlackBerry 10.3.1 to be released later 2014.  From the time of the release of BlackBerry 10.3.1, it will not be possible to upload new Adobe Air-based apps to BlackBerry World.

See also
List of mobile app distribution platforms

References

External links
AppWorld.BlackBerry.com — official website

 
 
 
Mobile software distribution platforms